The Tungamah Football Netball Club Inc, nicknamed the Bears, is an Australian Rules football club playing in the Picola & District Football League.

The club is based in the small Victorian town of Tungamah, a town of just 300 people located approximately 250 km north of Melbourne.

The earliest recorded match involving Tungamah was a game against Lake Rowan on Saturday, 29 July 1882.

In 1883 there was also a Murray District Football Club based in Tungamah.

Tungamah FC joined the Benalla Tungamah Football League in 1938.

The club changed leagues following an administration disagreement between the AFL Goulburn-Valley and the Picola & District Football League in 2019, but returned to the P&DFL for season 2021.

Premierships

VFL / AFL Players
The following footballers were either born in Tungamah or played with the Tungamah FC prior to playing VFL / AFL senior grade football. The year indicates their VFL debut.
 1898 – Matthew Fell – Collingwood
 1899 – Wilfred Fell – Collingwood
 1909 – Joe Bourke – Richmond
 1913 – Don Munro – Fitzroy
 1918 – Claude Fell – Richmond
 1920 – Les Carbarns – St. Kilda & Hawthorn
 1920 – Sir Albert Chadwick – Melbourne & Hawthorn
 1924 – Ted Bourke – Richmond & South Melbourne
 1926 – Jack Kidd – Essendon, Carlton & Fitzroy
 1952 - Kevin Bond - Hawthorn
 1933 – Jack Cooper – Carlton
 1980 – Les Parish – Fitzroy & Melbourne

References

External links
Official Site
1926 Tungamah FC team photo

Picola & District Football League clubs
Australian rules football clubs in Victoria (Australia)
1888 establishments in Australia
Australian rules football clubs established in 1888